Peter-Paul Verbeek (born 6 December 1970, in Middelburg)  is Rector Magnificus of the University of Amsterdam and Professor of Philosophy and Ethics of Science and Technology in a Changing World since 1 October 2022.  

Prior to his appointment in Amsterdam, Verbeek, a Dutch philosopher of technology, has been chair of the philosophy department at the
University of Twente. He was a member of the Dutch council for the Humanities and chair of the Society for Philosophy and Technology. Since 2018, he has also been University Professor of Philosophy of Humans and Technology and scientific codirector of the DesignLab at the University of Twente. He is an honorary professor at Aalborg University in Denmark. Furthermore, Verbeek was, among other things, vice-chair of the Board of the Rathenau Institute and chair of the Committee for the Freedom of Scientific Pursuit at the Royal Netherlands Academy of Arts and Sciences.

Background 
Verbeek studied Philosophy of Science, Technology & Society at the University of Twente and obtained his PhD in 2000. His dissertation was published in English under the title "What things do: philosophical reflections on technology, agency and design". He worked closely together with 
Hans Achterhuis and 
Don Ihde in formulating an original, post-phenomenological approach in the tradition of
Philosophy of Technology. As chair of the philosophy department at the University of Twente, he has been chairman of the Young Academy, the platform for young researchers of the Royal Netherlands Academy of Arts and Sciences. He worked on a research project for which he obtained an NWO Vici grant aimed at the expansion of his theory of technological mediation in the areas of metaphysics, epistemology and ethics.

In 2018 Verbeek was elected member of the Royal Netherlands Academy of Arts and Sciences.

Theory of Technological Mediation 
Verbeek's theory of technological mediation builds on the postphenomenological approach that was firstly stipulated by  
Don Ihde. This approach finds its origins in a synthesis between classical phenomenology and American pragmatism, with as one of its major premises the thesis that "technology only bears meaning in a use context". From a critique of classical philosophy of technology, in which Verbeek explicitly elaborates on the existentialist philosophy of 
Karl Jaspers and the hermeneutic philosophy of technology of 
Martin Heidegger.

Verbeek presents as the purpose of his theory of technological mediation to systematically analyzing the influence of technology on human behavior in terms of the role technology plays in human-world relations. In his original theory, a number of different human-technology-world relations are stipulated (the first four based on the philosophy of Don Ihde):
 Embodiment relations: in which the technology does not call attention to itself but to aspects of the world given through it (e.g. glasses)
 Hermeneutic relations: in which the technology represents a certain aspect of the world (e.g. a thermometer) 
 Background relations: in which technology shapes the experiential context, going beyond conscious experience (e.g. room temperature through a central heating system)
 Alterity relations: in which technology presents itself as quasi other to the subject (e.g. an ATM)
 Cyborg relations: in which technology merges with the human (e.g., brain implants)
 Immersion relations: in which technology forms an interactive context (e.g., smart homes)
 Augmentation relations: in which technology mediates and alters our experience of the world, e.g., Google Glass.

A unique feature of Verbeek's philosophy of technology is its basis in an empirical analysis of technologies. Instead of generating an overarching framework by which the universal features of specific technologies can be analyzed, Verbeek takes the technology itself as point of departure; which is for example illustrated by his analysis of ultrasound technology

Selected works 
 Verbeek, P.P. (2011), Moralizing Technology: Understanding and Designing the Morality of Things. Chicago and London: University of Chicago Press.
 Verbeek, P.P. (2005), What Things Do – Philosophical Reflections on Technology, Agency, and Design. Penn State: Penn State University Press,  (264 pp.)
 Kroes, P. and P.P. Verbeek (eds.) (2014), The Moral Status of Technical Artefacts. Dordrecht: Springer,  (248 pp.)
 Verbeek, P.P. and A. Slob (eds.) (2006), User Behavior and Technology Development – Shaping Sustainable Relations between Consumers and Technologies. Dordrecht: Springer,  / 978-1-4020-4433-5 (412 pp.)

References

1970 births
Living people
21st-century Dutch philosophers
Philosophers of technology
Academic staff of the University of Twente
University of Twente alumni
Academic staff of the Delft University of Technology
People from Middelburg, Zeeland
Members of the Royal Netherlands Academy of Arts and Sciences